The subfamily Vespinae contains the largest and best-known eusocial wasps, including true hornets (the genus Vespa), and the "yellowjackets" (genera Dolichovespula and Vespula). The remaining genus, Provespa, is a small, poorly known group of nocturnal wasps from Southeast Asia. One genus, Palaeovespa, has been described the Paleocene to Eocene fossil records of North America and Europe.  Collectively, the group can be found on all continents except Antarctica, and several of these wasps are invasive species, introduced beyond their native ranges, and can be major pests.

References

Vespidae
Biological pest control wasps
Extant Eocene first appearances